is a railway station located in Otoineppu, Nakagawa District (Teshio), Hokkaidō prefecture, and is operated by the Hokkaido Railway Company.

Lines Serviced
Hokkaido Railway Company
Sōya Main Line

Adjacent stations

External links
Ekikara Time Table - JR Otoineppu Station

Railway stations in Hokkaido Prefecture
Railway stations in Japan opened in 1912